The Further Adventures of the Girl Spy is a 1910 American silent film produced by Kalem Company and directed by Sidney Olcott with Gene Gauntier in the leading role. A story of the Civil War.

Cast
 Gene Gauntier – Nan
 Alice Hollister 
 Sidney Olcott  
 Robert G. Vignola 
 Kenean Buel
 Thomas Santley

Production notes
The film was shot in Jacksonville, Florida.

A copy is kept in the collection of British Film Institute.

External links
 AFI Catalog

 The Further Adventures of the Girl Spy website dedicated to Sidney Olcott

1910 films
Silent American drama films
American silent short films
Films set in Florida
Films shot in Jacksonville, Florida
Films directed by Sidney Olcott
1910 short films
1910 drama films
American black-and-white films
1910s American films